Rendezvous Music (formerly known as Rendezvous Entertainment) is a record label founded by multiple-Grammy Award nominee and RIAA Certified Gold recording artist Dave Koz, radio entrepreneur Frank Cody and music business veteran Hyman Katz in 2002. At various times, the label has been distributed by Sony Music Entertainment's Red Distribution and Universal Music Group's Fontana Distribution. In 2008, artist Patti Austin received her first Grammy Award for album Avant Gershwin released on Rendezvous Entertainment in 2007. In 2011, artist Kirk Whalum received his first Grammy Award for song "It's What I Do" (feat. Lalah Hathaway) from album The Gospel According to Jazz Chapter III released on Rendezvous Music in 2010. Since its acquisition in August 2008, Rendezvous is part of the Mack Avenue Records label group and continues to release new music by Kirk Whalum, Jonathan Butler, Kyle Eastwood as well as previously unreleased music by Wayman Tisdale.

List of Rendezvous artists
Adani & Wolf
Brian Simpson
Camiel
Jonathan Butler
Kirk Whalum
Kyle Eastwood
Marc Antoine
Michael Lington
Patti Austin
Peanuts Whalum
Philippe Saisse
Praful
Svoy
Wayman Tisdale

References

American record labels
Smooth jazz record labels
Jazz record labels
Record labels established in 2002
2002 establishments in California